Alaunus was a Gaulish god of medicine and prophesy. It may also refer to:

Alaunus, the Roman name of the River Aulne in Brittany
Alaunus, the Roman name of a river on Great Britain variously identified with the Aln or Allan

See also
 Alauna (disambiguation)
 Alona (disambiguation)